Comet is an unincorporated community in Ashe County, North Carolina, United States, located west of Warrensville.

References

Unincorporated communities in Ashe County, North Carolina
Unincorporated communities in North Carolina